The 2006 FIVB Volleyball Men's World Championship was held in Japan from 17 November to 3 December 2006. Like the previous edition, 24 teams participated in the tournament. Brazil won the Tournament (retaining their championship title), defeating Poland 3:0 in the final match. Bulgaria placed 3rd, defeating Serbia and Montenegro 3:1 in the 3rd place match. The Polish team dedicated this achievement to the deceased Polish volleyball player Arkadiusz Gołaś. The team honored him at the award ceremony, when they wore T-shirts with the number 16 and the words "Golas".

Host
Finals hosts Japan. The tournament was held in six Japan cities.

Qualification

Pools composition

First round
Teams were seeded in the first three positions of each pool following the serpentine system according to their FIVB World Ranking as of 7 September 2005. FIVB reserved the right to seed the hosts as head of pool A regardless of the World Ranking. All teams not seeded were drawn to take other available positions in the remaining lines, following the World Ranking. The draw was held in Tokyo, Japan on 29 November 2005. Rankings are shown in brackets except the hosts who ranked 16th.

Second round

Squads

Venues

First round

All times are Japan Standard Time (UTC+09:00).
The top four teams in each pool qualified for the second round.

Pool A

|}

|}

Pool B

|}

|}

Pool C

|}

|}

Pool D

|}

|}

Second round
All times are Japan Standard Time (UTC+09:00).
The results and the points of the matches between the same teams that were already played during the first round were taken into account for the second round.
The top two teams in each pool qualified for the semifinals. The third and fourth ranked teams in each pool qualified for the 5th–8th semifinals, whereas the fifth and sixth ranked teams in each pool qualified for the 9th–12th semifinals.

Pool E

|}

|}

Pool F

|}

|}

Final round
All times are Japan Standard Time (UTC+09:00).

9th–12th places

9th–12th semifinals

|}

11th place match

|}

9th place match

|}

5th–8th places

5th–8th semifinals

|}

7th place match

|}

5th place match

|}

Final four

Semifinals

|}

3rd place match

|}

Final

|}

Final standing

Awards

Most Valuable Player
 Gilberto Godoy Filho
Best Scorer
 Héctor Soto
Best Spiker
 Dante Amaral
Best Blocker
 Aleksey Kuleshov

Best Server
 Matey Kaziyski
Best Setter
 Paweł Zagumny
Best Libero
 Aleksey Verbov

Marketing

Official song
The competition's official opening song was "Ready Go!" by Morning Musume .

Sponsors
Nippon Life
Japan Tobacco
Kyocera
Asahi Soft Drinks

Broadcasting

External links

Official website
Organizer website
Awards
Formula

 
FIVB Volleyball Men's World Championship
World Championship
FIVB Men's World Championship
V